The East Midlands is a region in central England.

East Midlands may also refer to several other things in, or associated with, the English region:

Transport
 East Midlands Airport
 East Midlands Railway, a train operating company
 East Midlands Parkway railway station, a "park and ride" station on the Midlands Main Line
 East Midlands Hub railway station, a planned station between Nottingham and Derby on the HS2 line

Other
 East Midlands (European Parliament constituency)
 East Midlands English, a traditional dialect
 East Midlands Oil Province, a geological area of oilfields
 East Midlands Counties Football League, a minor football league
 BBC East Midlands, a regional broadcaster